Cyprus competed at the 1984 Summer Olympics in Los Angeles, United States. Ten competitors, all men, took part in nine events in four sports.

Athletics

Men's 10.000 metres
 Marios Kassianidis
 Qualifying Heat — 29:06.08 (→ did not advance)

Men's Marathon
 Marios Kassianidis — 2:32:51 (→ 62nd place)
 Filippos Filippou — did not finish (→ no ranking)

Men's 3.000m Steeplechase:
 Philippos Philippou
 Semifinals — 8:39.47 (→ did not advance)

Men's Long Jump
 Dimitrios Araouzos
 Qualification — 5.67m (→ did not advance, 30th place)

Cycling

One cyclist represented Cyprus in 1984.

Individual road race
 Spyros Agrotis — did not finish (→ no ranking)

Judo

Men's under 78 kg:
 Ioannis Kouyallis - Preliminary:Lost to Gueye-Eljdji from Senegal

Men's under 86 kg:
 Costas Papacostas - Preliminary:Lost to Nose Seiki from Japan

Shooting

Men's trap:
 Anastasios Lordos - 173 (47th position)
 Demetrios Papachrysostomou - 176 (35th position)

Men's skeet:
 Petros Kyritsis - 192 (13th position)
 Michael Tymvios - 85 (abandon)

References

External links
Cyprus at the 1984 Summer Olympics by Cyprus Olympic Committee

Nations at the 1984 Summer Olympics
1984
Summer Olympics